LK-1 was a projected Soviet crewed lunar flyby spacecraft. It would be launched on a three-stage Proton launch vehicle. The project started in 1962 under the lead engineer Vladimir Chelomey, with the first flight planned for 1967.

The LK-1 had its origin in several early 1960s spacecraft projects under the generic names of kosmoplans and raketoplans.

In 1965 the project was cancelled in favour of the Soyuz 7K-L1 spacecraft.

Further developments came as the LK-700 direct-descent lunar lander program.

Configuration

The spacecraft consisted of the following modules:

 ADU Emergency Engine Unit 
 VA Capsule (crew module)   
 PAB Equipment-Rocket System Block (service module)   
 RB Translunar Injection Stage

Characteristics
 Crew Size: 2 
 Spacecraft delta v: 3,300 m/s 
 Electric System: 2.00 average kW.
 Gross mass: 17,000 kg 
 Un-fuelled mass: 4,000 kg
 Height: 5.20 m 
 Span: 7.27 m

External links
Encyclopedia Astronautica: 
LK-1, with an image of an assembled translunar spacecraft

References

Crewed spacecraft
Cancelled Soviet spacecraft
Soviet lunar program
Crewed space program of the Soviet Union
NPO Mashinostroyeniya products